Ihmir Smith-Marsette (born August 29, 1999) is an American football wide receiver for the Kansas City Chiefs of the National Football League (NFL). He played college football at Iowa and was drafted by the Minnesota Vikings in the fifth round of the 2021 NFL Draft.

Early life and high school
Smith-Marsette grew up in Newark, New Jersey. He initially attended St. Benedict's Preparatory School, where he played water polo, before transferring to Weequahic High School after his freshman year. As a senior, Smith-Marsette had 38 receptions for 773 yards and 13 touchdowns on offense and 43 tackles, three interceptions, and two fumble recoveries on defense and also scored three touchdowns as a return specialist.

College career
Smith-Marsette caught 18 passes for 187 yards and two touchdowns in his freshman season. As a sophomore he had 28 receptions for 361 yards and two touchdowns. As a junior, Smith-Marsette caught 44 passes for 722 yards and five touchdowns while also rushing for 108 yards and three touchdowns and returned 17 kickoffs for 503 yards and two touchdowns.

Professional career

Minnesota Vikings
Smith-Marsette was drafted by the Minnesota Vikings in the fifth round, 157th overall, of the 2021 NFL Draft. He signed his four-year rookie contract on May 13, 2021.

In Week 15 against the Chicago Bears, Smith-Marsette recorded his first career receiving touchdown.

On August 31, 2022, Smith-Marsette was waived by the Vikings after the acquisition of Jalen Reagor.

Chicago Bears
The Chicago Bears claimed Smith-Marsette off waivers on September 1, 2022. Smith-Marsette was waived on October 18.

Kansas City Chiefs
On October 21, 2022, Smith-Marsette was signed to the Kansas City Chiefs practice squad.  He was elevated to the active roster prior to the season finale against the Las Vegas Raiders on January 6, 2023. Smith-Marsette became a Super Bowl champion when the Chiefs won Super Bowl LVII 38-35 against the Philadelphia Eagles. He signed a reserve/future contract on February 15, 2023.

Legal issues
Smith-Marsette was arrested on November 1, 2020, for operating a vehicle while intoxicated. He was suspended from the team for the following game against Michigan State.

References

External links
Minnesota Vikings bio
Iowa Hawkeyes bio

1999 births
Living people
American football wide receivers
Players of American football from Newark, New Jersey
Iowa Hawkeyes football players
Minnesota Vikings players
Chicago Bears players
Kansas City Chiefs players